30,000 (thirty thousand) is the natural number that comes after 29,999 and before 30,001.

Selected numbers in the range 30001–39999

30001 to 30999
 30029 = primorial prime
 30030 = primorial
 30203 = safe prime
 30240 = harmonic divisor number
 30323 = Sophie Germain prime and safe prime
 30420 = pentagonal pyramidal number
 30537 = Riordan number
 30694 = open meandric number
 30941 = first base 13 repunit prime

31000 to 31999
 31116 = octahedral number
 31337 = cousin prime, pronounced elite, an alternate way to spell 1337, an obfuscated alphabet made with numbers and punctuation, known and used in the gamer, hacker, and BBS cultures.
 31395 = square pyramidal number
 31397 = prime number followed by a record prime gap of 72, the first above 52
 31721 = start of a prime quadruplet
 31929 = Zeisel number

32000 to 32999
 32043 = smallest number whose square is pandigital.
 32045 = can be expressed as a sum of two squares in more ways than any smaller number.
 32760 = harmonic divisor number
 32761 = 1812, centered hexagonal number
 32767 = 215 − 1, largest positive value for a signed (two's complement) 16-bit integer on a computer.
 32768 = 215 = 85, maximum absolute value of a negative value for a signed (two's complement) 16-bit integer on a computer.
 32800 = pentagonal pyramidal number
 32993 = Leyland number

33000 to 33999
 33333 = repdigit
 33461 = Pell number, Markov number
 33511 = square pyramidal number
 33781 = octahedral number

34000 to 34999
 34560 = 5 superfactorial
 34790 = number of non-isomorphic set-systems of weight 13.
 34841 = start of a prime quadruplet
 34969 = favorite number of the Muppet character Count von Count

35000 to 35999
 35720 = square pyramidal number
 35840 = number of ounces in a long ton (2,240 pounds)
 35890 = tribonacci number
 35899 = alternating factorial
 35937 = 333, chiliagonal number
 35964 = digit-reassembly number

36000 to 36999
 36100 = sum of the cubes of the first 19 positive integers
 36463 – number of parallelogram polyominoes with 14 cells
 36594 = octahedral number

37000 to 37999
 37378 = semi-meandric number
 37634 = third term of the Lucas–Lehmer sequence
 37666 = Markov number
 37926 = pentagonal pyramidal number

38000 to 38999
 38024 = square pyramidal number
 38209 = n such that n | (3n + 5)
 38416 = 144
 38807 = number of different ways in which ten million can be expressed as the sum of two prime numbers
 38962 = Kaprekar number

39000 to 39999
 39304 = 343
 39559 = octahedral number
 39648 = tetranacci number

References 

30000